An Sgarsoch (1,005 m) is a mountain in the Grampian Mountains of Scotland. It lies north in a very remote part of the Highlands, on the border of Aberdeenshire and Perthshire.

Rounded and unspectacular, An Sgarsoch is noted mainly for its isolation, situated where it is between the Cairngorms and the Mounth, miles away from any villages or towns. The most common approach to the mountain is from the upper reaches of the River Dee.

References

Mountains and hills of Perth and Kinross
Mountains and hills of Aberdeenshire
Marilyns of Scotland
Munros
One-thousanders of Scotland